Michael Edward Milton (born 28 November 1943) is a former English cricketer. Milton was a right-handed batsman who bowled slow left-arm orthodox. He was born in St Pancras, London.

Milton made his debut for Buckinghamshire in the 1979 Minor Counties Championship against Hertfordshire. Milton played Minor counties cricket for Buckinghamshire from 1979 to 1989, which included 46 Minor Counties Championship matches and 7 MCCA Knockout Trophy matches. In 1984, he made his List A debut against Lancashire in the NatWest Trophy. He played a further List A match for Buckinghamshire against Somerset in the 1985 NatWest Trophy. In his two List A matches, he scored 75 runs at a batting average of 37.50, with a high score of 42. With the ball he took two wickets at a bowling average of 29.00, with best figures of 1/13.

He also played for Finchley Cricket Club and Second XI cricket for the Middlesex Second XI.

References

External links
Michael Milton at ESPNcricinfo
Michael Milton at CricketArchive

1943 births
Living people
People from St Pancras, London
Cricketers from Greater London
English cricketers
Buckinghamshire cricketers